Polichne, or Polichna (Πολίχνα), was a town of ancient Crete. Its territory bordered upon that of Cydonia. In 429 BCE the Athenians assisted the inhabitants of Polichne in making war upon the Cydonians. Herodotus also mentions the Polichnitae, and says that this people and the Praesii were the only people in Crete who did not join the other Cretans in the expedition against Camicus in Sicily in order to revenge the death of Minos.

Its site is tentatively located near the modern Ag. Georgios, Vryses.

References

Populated places in ancient Crete
Former populated places in Greece